Gambia women's national under-17 football team represents Gambia in international youth football competitions.

FIFA U-17 Women's World Cup

The team has qualified in 2012

African U-17 Cup of Nations for Women

Previous squads
2012 FIFA U-17 Women's World Cup

See also
Gambia women's national football team

References

External links 
Gambia Football Federation

women
Women's national under-17 association football teams